Kardan University ( / ) founded in 2002 in Kabul, Afghanistan is the first privately owned university in Afghanistan. It began its operations in a small classroom with 15 students in a country that was experiencing privatization in higher education for the first time.

The institute quickly became one of the largest private higher education institutions in the country and was elevated to university status by the Ministry of higher Education in 2006. Kardan University consists of five important pillars including Operations, Academics, Strategy & Growth, Registrar Office and Financial Management. Today the university is a hub for education, research, innovation, and public engagement offering accredited graduate and undergraduate degrees in multiple disciplines. It has over 4,000 students pursuing diploma, undergraduate and graduate programs at its three campuses in Kabul city. The university offers courses in management sciences, information technology, engineering, and social sciences at the undergraduate level, and business administration and international relations at the graduate level. Kardan has produced more than 30,000 graduates across multiple disciplines.

Brief History

2021

The BBA program is accredited by the Accreditation Council for Business Schools and Programs (ACBSP) and the university maintains its place in the Times Higher Education Impact Rankings. It also maintained the top ranking at the Quality Assurance and Accreditation Directorate of the Ministry of Higher Education. Launching the second Strategic Plan for the years 2020–2025. Kardan University launches the Annual Conference on Higher Education in Afghanistan (ACHEDA) series and inaugurates the Center for Higher Education Development (CHED).

Kardan University Chancellor, Dr. Ahmad Khalid Hatam is selected as board member at Afghanistan Cricket Board (ACB). Also, the university organizes the Kardan University Cricket Cup, played against Ireland in Dubai, UAE.

2020

The COVID-19 pandemic strikes and most of the educational activities are halted or at least disturbed. However, Kardan University has some major accomplishments in 2020. Soon after the lockdown, Kardan is the first university to launch online classes for all its programs. 

The university is included in the Times Higher Education Impact Rankings 2020 among the most impactful universities around the world. Also, the MBA program is accredited by the International Accreditation Council for Business Education (IACBE)

2019

Kardan University, along with five other universities, achieves National Accreditation Award from the Ministry of Higher Education (MoHE) of the Islamic Republic of Afghanistan. The accreditation is a testament to the excellence in quality of services offered by the university as envisioned by its vision and mission statements.

Also, Kardan University celebrates the success of Mr. Qais Mohammadi, academic administrator for economics department, as the recipient of the ACBSP 2019 Teaching Excellence Award for South Asia

2018

A Kardan University obtains its academic accreditation from Ministry of Higher Education and by getting the highest scores, becomes the top ranked university in Afghanistan. Kardan University becomes the only university from Afghanistan to be granted full membership at the Asia Pacific Quality Network (APQN). Also in this year, the university is accepted as a candidate for accreditation by Association to Advance Collegiate Schools of Business (AACSB), the Accreditation Council for Business Schools and Programs (ACBSP) and Council for Higher Education Accreditation (CHEA).

2017

After a rigorous application process, Kardan University becomes the first institution in Afghanistan to be accepted as a member of the prestigious Global Business School Network (GBSN). Kardan University is chartered to issue master's and bachelor's degrees in International Relations and Journalism respectively. With two successful entry tests in spring and fall seasons, hundreds of new students are enrolled in all Master's, Bachelor's and Diploma programs, including the first batches of Master's in International Relations (MIR) and Bachelor's in Journalism (BJ). As part of its strategic vision, Kardan University establishes Faculty Development Center to improve intellectual capacity of the faculty working at Kardan University.

2016

Kardan University introduced a unified platform for helping its students in different aspects of their educational journey and career. The Students Success Center, which is one of its kind among local universities, provides services in Career Development, Academic Writing, Events Management, Scholarships and Financial Aid, Alumni and Gender Relations.

2015

Kardan University becomes the first Afghan University to be accredited by the International Assembly of Collegiate Business Education (IACBE) for its Business Management program. In the same year Kardan University organizes a major consultation conference hosting academic intellectuals, university leadership, faculty and student representatives, aimed at revising and updating the whole university curriculum and making it even more aligned with international standards.

2014

Kardan University becomes chartered to issue master level programs in business and international relations. Student enrollment stands at over 5,000.

2013

Kardan University is re-elected as the chair of Private Universities in Afghanistan. It is ranked as one of the top private institutes of higher education and is officially recognized as a "Private University" following a ministerial evaluation.

2012

Kardan University leads the establishment of Afghanistan's first association of private universities. The university is subsequently elected as the chair with an initial membership of 40 national private institutions.

2011

Kardan University initiates the accreditation process through the International Association of Collegiate Business Education (IACBE) becoming the first candidate for accreditation, representing Afghanistan. Student enrollment reaches a peak of 6,000.

2009

Law and Political Science undergraduate programs are launched. Kardan University celebrates the graduation of the first cohort of BBA students. Kardan University launches Kardan School of Excellence, offering primary and secondary level education.

2006

Kardan makes history by becoming the first private higher education institute officially registered with the Government of Afghanistan. Bachelor of Business Administration (BBA) program is launched with over 130 students enrolled in the first cohort.

2004

Kardan expands academic programs introducing diploma level programs enrolling more than 600 students with around 20% women participation.

2002

Kardan Institute is founded with 12 students in a rental facility in Macroryan area of Kabul. The main goal was to provide short-term certificate programs.

References 

Universities in Afghanistan
Schools in Kabul
Educational institutions established in 2002
2002 establishments in Afghanistan
Private universities in Afghanistan